Tun Datuk Seri Utama Mohd Khalil bin Yaakob (Jawi: محمد خليل بن يعقوب; born 29 December 1937) is a Malaysian politician who served as the 6th Yang di-Pertua Negeri of Malacca from June 2004 to June 2020, 12th Menteri Besar of Pahang from August 1986 to May 1999, Minister of Information in the Barisan Nasional (BN) administration under former Prime Minister Mahathir Mohamad from December 1999 to March 2004 and Member of Parliament (MP) for Kuantan from November 1999 to March 2004. He is a member of the United Malays National Organisation (UMNO), a component party of the ruling BN coalition.

Early life
Born in Kuantan, Khalil attended Malay College Kuala Kangsar and later graduated with a Bachelor of Arts from the University of Malaya. He was a career diplomat and served in Italy, Morocco, Singapore and Indonesia.

Political career
Khalil is a member of UMNO and served on its supreme council from 1984. He became party secretary-general in 1999 until his appointment as governor.

His was first elected to the Bukit Ibam state seat in the Pahang State Assembly during the 1978 general elections.  In 1982, he won the Maran parliamentary seat and was appointed Deputy Minister of Education. He joined the Cabinet in 1984, serving as Minister in the Prime Minister's Department.

Khalil won the Bukit Tajau state seat in the 1986 general elections, and became Menteri Besar of Pahang. He served for three terms, until 1999. In the 1999 general elections, he rejoined federal politics and was elected as Member of Parliament for Kuantan. He was appointed Minister of Information but did not contest the next election, held in 2004.

In April 2001, a police report was lodged by Pahang state assemblyman Fauzi Abdul Rahman alleging that Mohd Khalil misappropriated state resources as Pahang Menteri Besar.

Governor
On 4 June 2004, Khalil was appointed Yang di-Pertua Negeri of Malacca by Yang di-Pertuan Agong Tuanku Syed Sirajuddin.

During his term as the Yang di-Pertua Negeri (Governor), Khalil's main goal was to make Malacca a progress state in the year 2010 and then "Green Technology City State" in the year 2013. He was also made Malacca City as the UNESCO's World Heritage Site on 7 July 2008.

Among state major projects under his reign included, Pulau Melaka, Malacca Straits Mosque, Hang Tuah Mall in Jalan Hang Tuah, Dataran Pahlawan Megamall, Menara Taming Sari, Hang Tuah Village in Duyong, Hang Tuah Jaya, Melaka Planetarium, Melaka Sentral, Melaka Monorail, UTC Melaka, upgrading the airport in Batu Berendam into international airport, Melaka Gateway and Malacca coastal reclamation land project.

Interests
Mohd Khalil is fan of Indian actor M. G. Ramachandran and Tamil cinema in general. In August 2011, he re-enacted MGR's role in the film Vettaikaaran in a 45-minute performance at the State Culture and Art Auditorium.

Legacy
The Tun Mohd Khalil Yaakob Mosque at Tanjung Minyak is named after him.

Election results

Honours
He has been awarded :

Honours of Malaysia 
:
  Companion of the Order of Loyalty to the Crown of Malaysia (JSM) (1979)
  Commander of the Order of Loyalty to the Crown of Malaysia (PSM) - Tan Sri (1989)
 Grand Commander of the Order of the Defender of the Realm (SMN) - Tun (2004)
: 
 Knight Grand Commander of the Order of the Life of the Crown of Kelantan (SJMK) - Dato' 
 :
  Grand Master and Knight Grand Commander of the Exalted Order of Melaka (DUNM) - Datuk Seri Utama (2004)
:
 Companion of the Order of the Crown of Pahang (SMP)
 Knight Companion of the Order of Sultan Ahmad Shah of Pahang (DSAP) - Dato'
 Grand Knight of the Order of the Crown of Pahang (SIMP) - formerly Dato', now Dato' Indera
 Grand Knight of the Order of Sultan Ahmad Shah of Pahang (SSAP) - Dato' Sri (1987)
:
 Supreme Class Member of the Order of Sultan Mizan Zainal Abidin of Terengganu (SUMZ) - Dato' Seri Utama
:
 Grand Commander of the Order of Kinabalu (SPDK) - Datuk Seri Panglima
:
 Knight Grand Commander of the Order of the Star of Hornbill Sarawak (DP) - Datuk Patinggi

Foreign honours 
: 
 Knight Grand Cross of the Order of Merit of the Federal Republic of Germany

Honorary doctorate 
He was also awarded the Honorary Doctorate (PhD) in Leadership from Limkokwing University of Creative Technology (LUCT) on 29 September 2016.

References

External links
 Office of the Governor

Chief Ministers of Pahang
Government ministers of Malaysia
Malaysian people of Malay descent
Malaysian Muslims
1937 births
Living people
People from Pahang
United Malays National Organisation politicians
Members of the Dewan Rakyat
Members of the Dewan Negara
Members of the Pahang State Legislative Assembly
Pahang state executive councillors
University of Malaya alumni
Yang di-Pertua Negeri of Malacca

Grand Commanders of the Order of the Defender of the Realm
Commanders of the Order of Loyalty to the Crown of Malaysia
Grand Commanders of the Order of Kinabalu
Knights Grand Commander of the Order of the Star of Hornbill Sarawak

Grand Crosses 1st class of the Order of Merit of the Federal Republic of Germany